Winchester is an unincorporated community in Douglas County, Oregon, United States.

Winchester sits on the south side of the North Umpqua River on Oregon Highway 99.  The Winchester Bridge spans the North Umpqua River. Winchester is also known for the Winchester Dam that was constructed in 1889 and is on the National Register of Historic Places.

History
Winchester was laid out in 1850 by surveyor Addison R. Flint, who was part of an Umpqua exploring expedition from San Francisco. The town was named for one of two brothers named Winchester who took part in the expedition, probably Heman Winchester, who was the expedition's captain. Winchester was the largest settlement in the Umpqua Valley for many years and the county seat until 1854, when it was moved to Roseburg. Winchester post office was established in 1851, and Flint served as the first postmaster. The community was incorporated as a city by the Oregon Legislative Assembly on February 20, 1891.

Climate
This region experiences warm (but not hot) and dry summers, with no average monthly temperatures above .  According to the Köppen Climate Classification system, Winchester has a warm-summer Mediterranean climate, abbreviated "Csb" on climate maps.

References

External links
Historic image of the North Umpqua at Winchester from Salem Public Library
Biography of A. R. Flint
Addison R. Flint obituary from Salem Pioneer Cemetery

Former cities in Oregon
Unincorporated communities in Douglas County, Oregon
1850 establishments in Oregon Territory
Unincorporated communities in Oregon
Former county seats in Oregon